Gunhilda of Denmark ( 1020 – 18 July 1038), was Queen consort of Germany by her marriage with King Henry III from 1036 until her death.

Biography
Gunhilda was a daughter of King Cnut the Great (985/95 – 1035), ruler over the Anglo-Scandinavian North Sea Empire, and his second wife Emma of Normandy (c. 985 – 1052). She was thus a member of the House of Knýtlinga and a sister of King Harthacnut, a half-sister of King Svein Knutsson of Norway and King Harold Harefoot of England, and Alfred Aetheling , Edward the Confessor and Godgifu (daughter of Æthelred the Unready).

About 1025, Gunhilda came to Germany as a child. Her engagement with Henry III, the son and heir of Emperor Conrad II and his consort Gisela of Swabia, was part of a pact of her father Cnut over peaceful borders of the Danish Duchy of Schleswig with Imperial Holstein in the area of Kiel. The agreement had occurred prior to the death of Canute in 1035.

Queen
During the Easter celebration in 1028, Henry received regality from the hands of his father with consent of the princes and was vested with the duchies of Bavaria and Swabia. Conrad temporarily had evolved plans to marry his son with Zoe Porphyrogenita, a daughter of the Byzantine Emperor Constantine VIII. Nevertheless, after these ambitions had failed, Gunhilda and Henry were finally betrothed at Pentecost 1035 in Bamberg and married one year later in Nijmegen. Upon her wedding, she took the German name Kunigunde.

According to the chronicles of Alberic de Trois-Fontaines and William of Malmesbury, Gunhilda was accused of adultery and defended in trial by combat, but after her champion's victory she disdained the success and became a nun. However, it seems that Gunhilda and her husband reconciled shortly afterwards.

In December 1038, Emperor Conrad went on a campaign to Italy, while Empress Gisela together with Henry and Gunhilda celebrated Christmas in Regensburg. Stuck in a fierce conflict with quarrelsome Archbishop Aribert of Milan, Conrad asked his son for support and both Henry III and Gunhilda followed him on his expedition. In Italy, Gunhilda gave birth to the couple's only daughter, Beatrice (d. 1061), who later became Abbess of Quedlinburg and Gandersheim.

While the siege of Milan proved unsuccessful, Emperor Conrad in 1038 was asked to intervene in a territorial dispute between Guaimar IV of Salerno and Pandulf IV of Capua. He campaigned in the Mezzogiorno in support of Guaimar, took Capua and had Pandulf deposed. Their victory found most of the Mezzogiorno loyal to the Holy Roman Empire.

During the return journey to Germany, an epidemic (possibly malaria) broke out among the Imperial troops, which claimed many victims. Duke Herman IV of Swabia and Gunhilda were among the casualties.

Gunhilda's body was transferred to Germany and buried in the Limburg Abbey church. As her husband was not crowned King of the Romans until the death of his father Emperor Conrad II in 1039, Gunhilda was never crowned German queen.

Ancestry

Notes

1020s births
1038 deaths
Year of birth uncertain
11th-century Danish people
11th-century English nobility
11th-century Norwegian nobility
11th-century German nobility
11th-century Danish women
11th-century English women
11th-century Norwegian women
11th-century German women
11th-century women of the Holy Roman Empire
Danish princesses
English princesses
Norwegian princesses
German queens consort
Duchesses of Swabia
Salian dynasty
Cnut the Great
House of Knýtlinga
Holy Roman Empresses
Daughters of kings